Rasovo may refer to:
 Rasovo, Montana Province, a village in northern Bulgaria
 Rasovo, Kyustendil Province, a village in southern Bulgaria
 Rasovo, Montenegro, a village in Montenegro

See also 
 Rasova (disambiguation)